Ottoman is the Turkish spelling of the Arabic masculine given name Uthman. It may refer to:

Governments and dynasties
 Ottoman Caliphate, an Islamic caliphate from 1517 to 1924
 Ottoman Empire, in existence from 1299 to 1922
 Ottoman dynasty, ruling family of the Ottoman Empire
 Osmanoğlu family, modern members of the family
 Ottoman architecture

Ethnicities and languages
 Ottoman Armenians, the Armenian ethnic group in the Ottoman Empire
 Ottoman Greeks, the Greek ethnic group in the Ottoman Empire
 Ottoman Serbs, the Serbian ethnic group in the Ottoman Empire
 Ottoman Turks, the Turkic ethnic group in the Ottoman Empire
 Ottoman Turkish alphabet
 Ottoman Turkish language, the variety of the Turkish language that was used in the Ottoman Empire

Products
 Ottoman bed, a type of storage bed
 Ottoman (furniture), padded stool or footstool
 Ottoman (textile), fabric with a pronounced ribbed or corded effect, often made of silk or a mixture

See also
 Rise of Empires: Ottoman, series.
 Otto Mann, character in The Simpsons
 Ottoman Turkish (disambiguation)
 Osman (disambiguation)
 Usman (disambiguation)